Omorgus melancholicus is a beetle of the family Trogidae.

References 

melancholicus
Beetles described in 1857